Liotella corona is a species of minute sea snail, a marine gastropod mollusc in the family Skeneidae.

Description
The height of the white shell attains 0.28 mm, its diameter 0.82 mm. The minute shell has a discoid shape. It is not nacreous. The spire is sunken. The umbilicus is wide and shallow. The shell consists of three whorls. The last half-whorl comes scarcely in contact with the others, and is suddenly and deeply deflected.

Sculpture: The body whorl is ringed by 16 thick, projecting, distant ribs which fade above and below at the sutures. These ribs continue on the suture for about half a whorl. The interstices of the ribs are faintly spirally scratched. The very oblique aperture is  circular and fortified by a varix.

Distribution
This marine species is endemic to Australia.

References

 Petterd, W. 1884. Description of new Tasmanian shells. Journal of Conchology 4: 135-145
 Cotton, B. C., 1959. South Australian Mollusca. Archaeogastropoda.  W.L. Hawes, Adelaide.. 449 pp., 1 pl.

corona
Gastropods of Australia
Gastropods described in 1902